Faraba  is a village and rural commune in the Cercle of Kati in the Koulikoro Region of south-western Mali. The commune contains 6 villages and in the 2009 census had a population of 9,577.

References

External links
.

Communes of Koulikoro Region